Huw is a Welsh given name, a variant of Hugo or  Hugh. Notable people with the name include:
Huw Bennett (born 1983), Welsh rugby player
Huw Bunford (born 1967), guitarist in the Welsh rock band Super Furry Animals
Huw Cadwaladr, Welsh poet
Huw Cae Llwyd (1431–c.1504), Welsh poet
Huw Ceredig (1942–2011), Welsh actor
Huw Davies (chemist), British chemist
Huw Davies (rugby union) (born 1959), English rugby union player
Huw Dixon (born 1958), Professor of Economics at Cardiff University
Huw Edwards (conductor), Welsh conductor
Huw Edwards (journalist) (born 1961), Welsh journalist, presenter and newsreader
Huw Edwards (politician) (born 1953), Welsh Labour Party politician, and Member of Parliament
Huw T. Edwards (1892–1970), Welsh trade union leader and politician
Huw Edwards-Jones (born 1956), British cabinetmaker
Huw Evans (born 1985), also known as H. Hawkline, Welsh singer-songwriter and radio and television presenter
Huw Garmon (born 1966), Welsh actor
Huw Gower, British guitarist
Huw Higginson (born 1964), English actor
Huw Irranca-Davies (born 1963), British Labour politician from Wales
Huw Jenkins (born 1958), British businessman; CEO and Chairman of UBS Investment Bank
Huw Jones (rugby union) (born 1993), Scottish Rugby Union player
Huw Lewis, (born 1964), National Assembly for Wales member
Huw Lawlor, (born 1996), Irish hurler
Huw Lewis-Jones (born 1980), British historian, editor, broadcaster and art critic
Huw Lloyd-Langton (1951–2012), English guitarist, Hawkwind
Huw Menai (1886–1961), Welsh English-language poet
Huw Pill, British economist, chief economist of the Bank of England
Huw Pritchard (born 1976), Welsh racing cyclist
Huw Justin Smith (1965–2007), also known as Pepsi Tate, Welsh bass guitarist
Huw Spratling (born 1949), British composer
Huw Stephens (born 1981), Welsh radio presenter, BBC Radio Cymru and BBC Radio 6Music
Huw Swetnam, British slalom canoeist
Huw Thomas Edwards (1892–1970), Welsh trade union leader and politician
Huw van Steenis (born 1969), British banker
Huw Warren (born 1962), Welsh jazz pianist and composer
Huw Waters (born 1986), Welsh cricketer
Huw Watkins (born 1976), British composer and pianist
Huw Wheldon (1916–1986), BBC broadcaster and executive
Huw Williams, Welsh football coach and former player
Jeremy Huw Williams (born 1969), Welsh baritone opera singer
Robert Huw Morgan (born 1967), Welsh-born organist, conductor and teacher
Robin Huw Bowen (born 1957), Welsh triple harp player

Fictional
Huw Edwards (EastEnders), a character in the BBC soap opera EastEnders

See also
 Hugh (given name)
 Hughes (given name)
 Hugo (name)
 Hugues (disambiguation)

Welsh masculine given names